Memory is the fourth extended play by South Korean girl group Mamamoo. It was released by RBW on November 7, 2016 and distributed by CJ E&M Music. It contains eight songs, including the singles "New York" and "Décalcomanie", the soundtrack single "Woo Hoo" from LG G5 And Friends OST, and the sub-unit tracks "Dab Dab" and "Angel".

Release and chart performance
On October 26, 2016, Mamamoo announced that a new album would be released in the next month. They began teasing the album from October 27, by posting member teaser images, music video teasers, secret codes and the unveiling of the official track list. Two sub-unit performances and a pre-release single were released prior to this to build anticipation for the group's upcoming return. The first sub-unit song "Dab Dab" performed by the group's rap line (Moonbyul and Hwasa) charted at number 69, while the second sub-unit song "Angel" performed by the group's vocal line (Solar and Wheein) charted higher at number 26. The first single from the album, "New York", was released on September 21, the song both entered and peaked at number 9 on the Gaon Digital Chart. The full album was accompanied by two music videos, one being for the title track were released on November 7.

Composition and promotion
Mamamoo produced Memory with Kim Do-Hoon, an executive of Rainbow Bridge World who led them to their current success.

Track listing

Charts

Weekly charts

Monthly charts

Year-end charts

Awards

Music programs

Notes

References

2016 EPs
Mamamoo EPs
Korean-language EPs
Stone Music Entertainment EPs